Herathrips is a genus of thrips in the family Phlaeothripidae.

Species
 Herathrips nativus

References

Phlaeothripidae
Thrips
Thrips genera